Ranunculus aquatilis, the common water-crowfoot or white water-crowfoot, is a plant species of the genus Ranunculus, native throughout most of Europe and western North America, and also northwest Africa.

This is an aquatic plant, growing in mats on the surface of water. It has branching thread-like underwater leaves and toothed floater leaves. In fast flowing water the floaters may not be grown. The flowers are white petaled with yellow centres and are held a centimetre or two above the water. The floater leaves are used as props for the flowers and are grown at the same time.

References

External links
 Jepson Manual Treatment
 Washington Burke Museum
 Photo gallery
 

aquatilis
Freshwater plants
Flora of Europe
Flora of the United Kingdom
Flora of the Western United States
Flora of California
Garden plants
Flora of North America
Plants described in 1753
Taxa named by Carl Linnaeus